Theodor Wulf (28 July 1868 – 19 June 1946) was a German physicist and Jesuit priest who was one of the first experimenters to detect excess atmospheric radiation.

Theodor Wulf became a Jesuit priest at the age of 20, before studying physics with Walther Nernst at the University of Göttingen. He taught physics at Valkenburg, a Jesuit University from 1904 to 1914 and 1918-1935. He designed and built an electrometer which could detect the presence of energetic charged particles (or electromagnetic waves). Since natural radiation sources on the ground were detected by his electrometer, he predicted that if he moved far enough away from those sources he would detect less radiation.

To test his hypothesis, in 1910 he compared the radiation at the bottom and the top of the Eiffel Tower.  He found that the ionisation fell from 6 ions cm−3 to 3.5 ions cm−3 as he ascended the Eiffel Tower (330m).  If the ionisation had been due to γ-rays originating at the surface of the Earth, the intensity of ions should have halved in 80m.  Energy was coming from outside the Earth's atmosphere and being detected by his device; this radiation was from cosmic rays. He published a paper in Physikalische Zeitschrift detailing the results of his four days of observation on the Eiffel Tower. His results were not initially accepted.

Publications
 Uber den Einfluss des Druckes auf die elektromotorische Kraft der Gaselektroden. Physikalische Zeitschrift Chemie
 About the radiation of high penetration capacity contained in the atmosphere. Physikalische Zeitschrift
 Einstein's relativity theory, 1921.
 Text book of physics, 1926.
 Electrostatic attempts with application of the universal electroscope, 1928.
 The oscillatory movement, 1931.
 The Thread Electrometers, 1933.
 The Components of the Body World, 1935.

See also
 Radiant energy
 List of Jesuit scientists
 List of Roman Catholic scientist-clerics

Citations

External links
 
 Theodor Wulf: ""About the radiation of high penetration capacity contained in the atmosphere" Physikalische Zeitschrift, 10th year, no. 5, pages 152-157
 Victor F. Hess: "About Observations of the Penetration {through-going} Radiation During 7 Balloon Flights"
 Victor F. Hess: "About the absorption of gamma rays in the atmosphere"

19th-century German physicists
19th-century German Jesuits
University of Göttingen alumni
20th-century German Jesuits
1868 births
1946 deaths
Jesuit scientists
20th-century German physicists